Hemiculter tchangi is a species of cyprinid fish in the genus Hemiculter which has been recorded only from the upper reaches of the Yangtze River in Sichuan.

References 

 

tchangi
Fish described in 1942
Cyprinid fish of Asia